Moscow Aviation Institute (National Research University) (MAI; , МАИ) is one of the major engineering institutes in Moscow, Russia. Since its inception MAI has been spearheading advances in aerospace technology both within Russia and worldwide. The university laid emphasis on laboratory instruction in applied science and engineering, specific to the demands of aerospace industry.

During World War II part of the university was evacuated to Almaty, Kazakhstan. Staffs and students continued to work on research and wartime production throughout the war.
During the Post-War period, the university expanded and assimilated new technologies during the Jet age. Research conducted in the university contributed to heralding the space age.

The university has to its merit more than 160,000 specialists, 250 chief designers in the Aerospace Industry. 50 Academicians of the Russian Academy of Sciences, 22 cosmonauts, 100 test pilots and 60 Olympic champions in different sports.

Alumni of the institute form the backbone of many companies like Sukhoi, Mikoyan, Ilyushin, Tupolev, Yakovlev, Beriev, Myasishchev, Mil Moscow Helicopter Plant, OAO S.P. Korolev Rocket and Space Corporation Energia, Lavochkin, Makeyev Rocket Design Bureau, Khrunichev State Research and Production Space Center, NPO Energomash, Almaz-Antey and others.

History

Founding and vision 

There was a task in the USSR – to prepare 435,000 engineers and technicians in five years (1930–1935) during the USSR industrialization period, while their number in 1929 was 66,000.

Moscow Aviation Institute (National Research University) was established on 20 March 1930 as Higher Aero-mechanical college (VAMU) by the order of Supreme Soviet of the National Economy in order to ensure training of qualified personnel for the aviation industry. The Aero-mechanical faculty of Bauman Moscow State Technical University formed the basis of the new university. On 29 August 1930, the university was renamed as Moscow Aviation Institute. In the beginning it had 3 departments, Aeronautical, Aircraft engines and Aerodynamics. On its tenth anniversary in 1940, the university had established itself as a premier aeronautical university with 38 departments, 22 laboratories and a Student design office and production facility.

The uniqueness of the MAI is that historically it was created to train specialists for almost all departments and teams in the Design Bureaus of the aviation industry.

World War II 

On 22 June 1941, Nazi Germany invaded the Soviet Union. The students and faculty members were mobilized to work in aircraft workshops and design offices. Many students signed up to join the armed forces during the Battle of Moscow, many continued to work aircraft production facilities and armaments workshops.

The university was partly evacuated to Almaty, Kazakhstan under the leadership of Alexander Yakovlev. By 1942 the Moscow campus of MAI started functioning in parallel with the Almaty campus. It was in the workshops of MAI in Almaty, Mikhail Kalashnikov, the legendary rifle designer worked on his AK-47 assault rifle.

By 1943, the university was completely relocated back to Moscow. Members of the university were involved in research & designing new combat aircraft and sub-systems, along with refining and redesigning existing aircraft, for the war effort.

In 1945 the institute was awarded the Order of Lenin.

Jet age & Space age 

Although prototypes of the first jet aircraft were made as far back as 1910 by Henri Coandă, it war during World War II that significant developments were made.
Arkhip Lyulka designed the first Two-stage centrifugal compressor Turbojet in 1938. Alexander Bereznyak a graduate of MAI, designed the first jet aircraft in the USSR, the Bereznyak-Isayev BI-1 in 1942.

After the war, the university placed special emphasis on developing new technology required for developing jet aircraft and was quick to adapt to new technologies.
this was emphasised in May 1946, during the second Student technical conference, faculty members of the institute defended 6 post-doctoral thesis and 14 Ph.Ds on various aspects regarding development of jet aircraft. On 26 April 1946, Mikoyan-Gurevich MiG-9 became the first operational turbojet fighter in the USSR.

It was also in the same year Faculty of Radio electronics was established based on department of Radio-location, to assimilate newer technologies in the field of Radio location.

The era of helicopters began in USSR with two leading pioneers at MAI Boris Yuryev, inventor of Swashplate in helicopters and Bratukhin, they were awarded the state prize of the USSR in 1946. In 1952, department of helicopter design was established under the leadership of Prof. Boris Yuryev.

In 1955, the university celebrated its silver jubilee.

On 4 October 1957, the USSR launched the first artificial satellite opening up Space for mankind, graduates from MAI were deeply involved in the space program since its inception under the leadership of Sergey Korolev, the legendary chief designer of head of the Soviet space program and Mikhail Tikhonravov chief designer of satellites Sputnik-3, Luna-1, Luna-3, Luna-4.

Cold War 
During the cold war, students, faculty members and graduates of the university were involved in cutting-edge research in the fields of Aeronautics, Missile development and armaments research. They were pivotal in keeping the USSR ahead in the arms race in close collaboration with the aerospace and defense industry and research organizations like TsAGI, National Institute of Aviation Technologies, VIAM, TsIAM, TsNII VVS, Gromov Flight Research Institute among others.

Key figures from the university during this era were Rostislav Belyakov chief designer of MIG-29, Myasishchev, Mikhail Yangel, Sergey Mikheev chief designer of Kamov helicopters, Marat Tishchenko of Mil helicopters, Mikhail Reshetnev and others.

In 1962, the university established the Student design office(ОСКБ — объединение СКБ факультетов и кафедр), which integrated different faculties and departments within the institute to develop aircraft prototypes in-house and to provide greater exposure to students in design and production work. The Design office functions today as the OKKBES-MAI http://oskbes.ru/english.html.

Moscow Aviation Institute today 

Currently, MAI is the only university in Russia, which provides highly qualified personnel for the entire aerospace product life cycle from system design to implementation of the cutting-edge technologies in production, testing, utilisation, and aircraft recycling.

The present-day MAI is a unique institute of higher education where thorough theoretical knowledge are combined with various practical skills. More than 120 laboratories, 3 student design offices, 3 specialized resource centers, an experimental-design factory, and an aerodrome are available for the students.

In 1980 the institute was awarded the Order of the October Revolution.

In 1993 Moscow Aviation Institute was given one more name: "State Technological University". To date, the development in the field of aeronautics and astronautics is based mostly on the activities of institute professors and alumnus of the university.

Moscow Aviation Institute is a large scientific research center. Significant scientific ideas are developed here; new technological principles are discovered; new devices are invented and constructed. Five fundamental scientific discoveries for dynamic systems have been patented; the opto-electronic device "Photon" designed here is now operating in outer space; innovative power sources based on new principles invented and constructed here are currently used in aircraft and aerospace system units, etc.

In October 2009, the MAI was ranked among the 12 best universities of the Russian Federation. The rank of a "National research university" was conferred to the institute by decision of the Russian Government.

On 31 March 2015 the Ministry of Education reorganized Moscow Aviation Institute (MAI) by annexation of the Russian State Technological University named after Tsiolkovsky (MATI).

OSKBES MAI 

The history of aircraft creation in the MAI (Moscow Aviation Institute) began simultaneously with the foundation of the institute in 1930. The modern design bureau in the MAI was formed in 1965 as a students one. It was engaged in creation of experimental pilot and remote controlled light aircraft, which were developed according to the requirements specifications of various organizations of the Ministry of Aviation Industry (MAP), the Ministry of Civil Aviation (MGA) and the Ministry of Defense (MOP).

In 1982 by the order of Ministry of Aircraft Industry the Design Bureau was transformed into a branch-wise experimental students aircraft construction design bureau of the MAI. The work was carried out by professional engineers. If necessary the co-workers from among the MAI students and teachers and also from among the workers of the industry were invited. The production facility of the MAI aircraft development plant (EOZ) in the experimental development shop (shop No. 3) are staffed by qualified technicians. The OSKBES work on the experimental aircraft engineering constantly received high estimations of the industry. Their technical novelty and utility are confirmed by nine Introduction Certificates and more than twenty Invention Certificates. By the end of 1980s six experimental aircraft of different types were designed and built: Kvant, Elf-D UAV, PS-01 small-sized UAV, Elf, Photon and Yunior aircraft.

The basic structure, address and the industrial areas occupied by it in the OSKBES MAI have remained the same. The EOZ MAI (shop No. 3) and the MAPO (Moscow aircraft building plant) were used as an industrial base. On 27 July 1992 the application on realization the inspection work in the OKB MA for reception the certificate for the right to develop the civil aircraft engineering was sent to the Aviaregister of the MAK and the Air Industry Department of the Ministry of Industry of Russian Federation. It was made on behalf of the "Aviatika" joint-stock company. According to the inspection results the Aviaregister of the MAK issued Certificate No. R-9 to the "Aviatika" joint-stock company with the right to develop light civil aircraft. It was on 17 February 1993.

Aircraft designed and developed at OSKBES include

A single-seater Aviatika-MAI-890 aircraft — passed certification, had a temporary Certificate of a type of 31 March 1994 No. 52В-890, valid till 1 April 1995, is series produced by the RAC "MiG";
A two-seater Aviatika-MAI-890U aircraft is serially produced by the RAC "MiG";
An agricultural Aviatika-MAI-890SKh aircraft is serially produced by the RAC "MiG";
A single-seater Aviatika-MAI-900 aerobatics ("Akrobat")'
A two-seater Aviatika-MAI-910 with wings, folding on the ground;
An Aviatika-MAI-920 glider;
A single-seater Aviatika-MAI-890A autogyro, a pre-production model at the stage of flying test.
The basis for the "Aviatika" aircraft manufacture at the MAPO plant is the License Agreement concluded by this plant with the "Aviatika" joint-stock company on 10 April 1995 (contract No. 4276).

The personnel of the OSKBES have continued to work in the field of light civil aircraft together with the MAPO MIG.

On 27 April 1998, the Aviaregister of Interstate Aviation Committee issued a Design Organization Certificate R-52 of the developer of light civil aircraft.

29 September 1999 eight members of our design bureau, Moscow Aviation Institute and RAC "MIG" were rewarded by "State Prize of the Russian Federation in science and technology" for designing and development of light multipurpose airplanes in a serial production. They are:

OSKBES MAI Chief Designer K. Zhidovetskiy (posthumously);
OSKBES MAI Deputy Chief Designer (after the death of K. Zhidovetskiy —
Chief Designer) N. Goryunov;
OSKBES MAI Deputy Chief Designer V. Demin;
OSKBES MAI Deputy Chief Designer V. Feigenbaum;
Rector of MAI A. Matveyenko;
Manager of MAI Experimental Plant P. Ogadzhanov;
General Manager of RAC "MIG" plant G. Nemov;
Deputy Manager of RAC "MIG" O. Chukantsev.

Autogyro MAI-205 made the first flight in 2001, chief designer Andrey Zorin.

In 2002, OSKBES MAI has started designing a new plane MAI-223. This plane made the first flight in 2004.

In 2003, OSKBES MAI started to work on different aircraft, airships and autogyros. It designed and produced gondolas, nacelles, fly-by-wire power plant controls and empennages of NPO "RosAeroSystems" airships Au-30 and Au-12M.

The design and development of Autogyro MAI-208 was started in 2006. The first MAI-208 is undergoing testing. OSKBES MAI presented MAI-208 at the second international exhibition of the helicopter industry "HeliRussia-2009" (21...23 May 2009, Moscow). The new autogyro has caused the big interest of visitors and the press.

1 July 2008 Vadim Demin was appointed Chief Designer of OSKBES MAI. The same year the design office has started working on a new multi-purpose four-seat twin engine aircraft MAI-407.

In 2009 OSKBES MAI started designing a new training glider MAI-227.

Notable alumni 
The total of Moscow Aviation Institute alumni number in the hundreds of thousands. They work in design offices (foreign and domestic), plants, repair shops, scientific research institutes, universities, laboratories, aviation companies, in the center for Astronauts Training and other aircraft and aerospace engineering and technological institutions.

From 2007 to 2015, the Moscow Aviation Institute was headed by Professor , Doctor of Science. He was a 1977 MAI graduate.

List of notable alumni:

Engineers and scientists 
Guy Severin former General Director of JSC NPP Zvezda
Mikhail Pogosyan former general director of the United Aircraft Corporation, now (2019) - rector of MAI
Vasily Mishin Soviet and Russian rocket scientist and engineer 
Wang Yongzhi Chinese aerospace scientist, designer of China's first crewed spacecraft Shenzhou 5 and Shenzhou 6
Aleksandr Nadiradze, "father" of the mobile ICBMs
Peter Grushin
Valentin Bliznyuk, Soviet and Russian aircraft designer, chief designer of the Tupolev Tu-160
Alexander Dynkin
Anatoliy Koroteyev
Viktor Makeyev
Genrikh Novozhilov
Alexei Tupolev
Mikhail Yangel
Arseny Mironov aerospace scientist, engineer, aircraft pilot
Semyon Kosberg Jewish Soviet engineer, expert in the field of aircraft and rocket engines
Sergey Kapitsa son of Pyotr Kapitsa
Alexey Pajitnov creator of the video game Tetris

Cosmonauts 
(in order of first flight)
Valeri Kubasov Soviet/Russian cosmonaut
Valentin Lebedev Russian cosmonaut, Guinness Book of Records stay aboard the Space Station Salyut 7 which lasted 211 days 
Vladislav Volkov
Vitaly Sevastyanov
Aleksandr Ivanchenkov
Svetlana Savitskaya retired Russian aviator and cosmonaut
Igor Volk
Gennadi Manakov
Musa Manarov
Viktor Afanasyev
Anatoly Artsebarsky
Toktar Aubakirov
Aleksandr Poleshchuk
Yury Usachov
Nikolai Budarin
Aleksandr Lazutkin
Pavel Vinogradov
Leonid Kadeniuk
Mikhail Tyurin
Fyodor Yurchikhin
Mikhail Kornienko
Yelena Serova politician and former cosmonaut

Ambassadors 
 Anatoly Dobrynin
 Leonid Zamyatin
 Mikhail Smirnovsky
 Nikolay Firyubin
 and some other

Other 
Aleksandr Dugin Russian philosopher
Mikhail Nikolayevich Zadornov  Russian stand-up comedian and writer
Nkeirouka Ezekh Russian curler
Eduard Uspensky Russian writer and author of several children's books
Maksim Shevchenko editor, journalist and presenter on television and radio in Russia
Yevgeniya Chirikova Russian environmental activist
Lyudmila Titova retired Russian speed skater
Mike Fincke American Astronaut
Valery Kovalev Russian entrepreneur, philanthropist and Wikimedian.
Tatyana Russiyan-Gubanova Russian helicopter sports world record holder

Ratings 
In 2015 MAI reached top-200 Round University Ranking (RUR).

Schools 

 School №1. Aeronautical Engineering
 School №2. Engines for Flying Vehicles
 School №3. Control Systems, informatics and electropower systems
 School №4. Radio Electronics for flying vehicles
 School №5. The Institute of Business Engineering MAI
 School №6. Astronautical and rocket engineering
 School №7. Robotic and Intelligent Systems
 School №8. Applied Mathematics and Physics
 School №9. Applied Mechanics
 School №10. Social engineering
 Faculty of the Foreign Languages
 Preparatory School

Institutes 
 Continued Education and Re-certification
 Pre-admission Studies
 Learning center of computer technology
 Physics and mathematics school (Physmatshkola)
 Serpukov MAI department (with IIF RF)
 Institute of Military Science

Branches 
The institute has also several branches:
 Voskhod (Leninsk, Baikonur cosmodrome)
 Vzlet (Akhtubinsk)
 Strela (Zhukovskiy)
 Kometa (Khimki, former territorial faculty No. 20)
 Space technics (Khimki, former territorial faculty No. 50)

Partner universities 
  University of Liège, Belgium
  Instituto Tecnológico de Aeronáutica, Brazil
  Bedfordshire University , United Kingdom
 
 Dresden University of Technology, Germany
 Technische Universität Berlin, Germany
 Hyperschall Technologie Gottingen , Germany
 Hochschule Ingolstadt, Germany
 Hochschule Esslingen, Germany
 Hochschule Heilbronn, Germany
 Technische Universität München, Germany until 2005
  Bandung Institute of Technology, Indonesia
  Beihang University, China
  Ching Yun University, Taiwan

See also 
 MAI-223
 Avion MAI F-1

References

External links 

 English and other languages and Russian language official website  and 
 Russian language official page of Aerospace Faculty MAI 
 MAI.Exler.ru — student encyclopedia  
 Most popular MAI forum — more than 13500 users 
 Another MAI forum 
 YouTube channel MAI  and 
 Official FB page of MAI 

 
Universities and institutes established in the Soviet Union
National research universities in Russia
Aviation research institutes
Aerospace research institutes
Engineering universities and colleges in Russia
Research institutes in the Soviet Union
Universities in Moscow